Park Gwang-Min (born 14 May 1982) is a South Korean football midfielder.

He has played for Seongnam Ilhwa Chunma and Gwangju Sangmu in K-League.

Career statistics

External links 
K-League Player Record 
Korean FA Cup match result 

1982 births
Living people
Association football forwards
South Korean footballers
Seongnam FC players
Gimcheon Sangmu FC players
K League 1 players